Chase Garbers (born June 6, 1999) is an American football quarterback for the Las Vegas Raiders of the National Football League (NFL). He played college football at California.

Early years
Garbers attended Corona del Mar High School in Newport Beach, California. He was the full-time starting quarterback in his 2015 junior and 2016 senior campaigns, earning Daily Pilot Dream Team Player of the Year and first-team All-Pacific Coast League honors in both years, while he was also his conference MVP as a senior. Over his high school career, Garbers had a combined 589-of-854 (69.0%) passes for 7,970 yards with 90 touchdowns and 10 interceptions for a 129.1 quarterback rating.

Garbers was listed as four-star recruit, ranked No. 12 pro-style quarterback and No. 315 overall prospect in the country for the 2017 class.

College career
In 2016, Garbers committed to the University of California, Berkeley. He redshirted his first year at California in 2017. Garbers graduated with a B.A. in Political Economy in May 2021, then went on to earn a graduate certificate in business administration in December 2021.

2018 season
In 2018, Garbers shared Cal's starting quarterback position with Brandon McIlwain in a two-quarterback system, though Garbers started the majority of the season. In his first career start, Garbers completed 18 of 28 passes for 171 yards and two touchdowns against BYU.

Garbers led the Bears to their first victory against USC since 2003, winning 15-14 on the road. Garbers threw for 93 yards and one touchdown and rushed for another touchdown after falling behind 0-14 in the first half.

The Bears finished the 2018 season with a 7–6 record, including a loss at the Cheez-It Bowl against the TCU Horned Frogs. Struggling to find a rhythm on offense, the Bears' offensive efficiency ranked as the second worst among all Power Five teams. Garbers finished the season with 14 touchdowns, 10 interceptions, and 1,506 yards passing.

2019 season
In 2019, Garbers was named Cal's starting quarterback. He helped lead the Bears to a 4–0 start to the season, including a 20–19 upset win against No. 14 ranked Washington, earning the Bears a No. 15 ranking, their highest since 2009. Garbers had career highs in completions, yards passing, and touchdown passes in the Ole Miss game with 23-of-35 passes for 357 yards with four touchdown throws.

Garbers suffered a broken collarbone during the Arizona State game that sidelined him for the next five games, four of which were losses. He returned briefly for the USC game, but sustained a concussion close to the end of the first half.

Garbers returned to lead the Bears to a 24–20 win against Stanford in the Big Game, the first Big Game win for Cal since 2009. Garbers ran for a 16-yard game-winning touchdown, earning praise from Green Bay Packers quarterback and former Cal quarterback Aaron Rodgers. This win clinched bowl eligibility for the Bears while making the Cardinal ineligible for the post-season for the first time in ten years.

The Bears went to the Redbox Bowl, where they won against the Illinois Fighting Illini 35–20, their first bowl win since 2015. Garbers had a career best-tying 4 touchdowns and was named Offensive MVP for the game. The Bears finished the 2019 season with an 8–5 record (4–5 in Pac-12 play), with Garbers going undefeated in the 7 games in which he started and finished.

2020 season
Garbers entered his redshirt junior season on the Johnny Unitas Golden Arm Award Preseason Watch List. Due to the COVID-19 pandemic, the Pac-12 had a seven-game Conference-only lineup for the 2020 season. However, the Bears were ultimately only able to play four games for the season due to game cancellations. Garbers started the season 0–3, losing to UCLA, Oregon State, and Stanford. The Bears achieved their sole win in their last game against Oregon on December 5, ending the season with a 1–3 record.

2021 season 
Garbers entered his redshirt senior season as the starting quarterback. On November 6, 2021, Garbers was declared inactive for Cal's game versus Arizona on November 6, 2021 due to COVID-19, and the Bears were forced to postpone their game the following week for the same reason. On November 20, Garbers returned from COVID to lead the Bears to a 41–11 rout of rival Stanford, opening the game with an 84-yard pass to tight end Trevon Clark for the longest pass in the series history. Under Garbers, the Bears set a series record 636 yards of offense, and Garbers became the first Cal quarterback to win back-to-back road games at Stanford in 99 years, since Charles Erb in 1921 and 1922.

Statistics

Professional career

Las Vegas Raiders

2022
Garbers signed with the Las Vegas Raiders as an undrafted free agent on May 12, 2022. He was waived on August 30, 2022 and signed to the practice squad the next day. On December 31, 2022 with two regular season games remaining, Garbers was promoted to the active roster to backup quarterback to new starter Jarrett Stidham, after Derek Carr was benched for the remainder of the season.

References

External links
 Las Vegas Raiders bio
 California Golden Bears bio

1999 births
Living people
Sportspeople from Newport Beach, California
Players of American football from California
American football quarterbacks
California Golden Bears football players
Las Vegas Raiders players